Joel Garreau (born 1948) is an American journalist, scholar, and author.

In 1981, Garreau published The Nine Nations of North America. In 1991, he published Edge City: Life on the New Frontier. In 2005, he published Radical Evolution: The Promise and Peril of Enhancing Our Minds, Our Bodies—and What It Means to Be Human.
He has served as a fellow at Cambridge University, a Bernard L. Schwartz Fellow at New America Foundation, the University of California at Berkeley and George Mason University. Previously, he was a reporter and editor at The Washington Post. He is a senior fellow at the School of Public Policy at George Mason University, leading two groups, one studying the future of universities and the other examining which global gateway city regions will be the winners and losers in the year 2020.

See also
 Edge city
 Maes–Garreau law 
 Transhumanism
 Urban planning

References

External links 
Joel Garreau's web site

Profile at New America Foundation
Profile at Sandra Day O'Connor College of Law

1948 births
Living people
American male journalists
American non-fiction writers
American transhumanists
Arizona State University faculty
People from Pawtucket, Rhode Island
Urban theorists
Writers from Rhode Island